Cedar Ridge may refer to:
 Cedar Ridge, Arizona, a settlement in Coconino County, Arizona
Cedar Ridge, California (disambiguation), multiple locations
 Cedar Ridge (Disputanta, Virginia), c. 1750 farmhouse listed on the NRHP in Virginia
 Cedar Ridge Camp, a religious camp in Kentucky, United States
 Cedar Ridge High School (Hillsborough, North Carolina), a high school in North Carolina, United States
 Cedar Ridge High School (Round Rock, Texas), a high school in Texas, United States
 Cedar Ridge Middle School, a middle school in Alabama, United States